The Register of Historic Parks and Gardens of Special Historic Interest in England, created in 1983, is administered by Historic England.  It includes more than 1,600 sites, ranging from gardens of public houses, to cemeteries and public parks.

There are 128 registered parks and gardens in Yorkshire and the Humber. 7 are listed at grade I, the highest grade, 23 at grade II*, the middle grade, and 98 at grade II, the lowest grade.


Key

Parks and gardens

East Riding of Yorkshire

Lincolnshire

North Yorkshire

South Yorkshire

West Yorkshire

References

Notes

Listed parks and gardens in England
Yorkshire and the Humber